Tibetima is a small genus of east Asian palp-footed spiders. It was first described by Y. J. Lin and S. Q. Li in 2020, and it has only been found in China.  it contains only two species: T. char and T. gyirongensis.

See also
 Fernandezina
 Steriphopus
 List of Palpimanidae species

References

Further reading

Palpimanidae genera
Spiders of China